Liberty University College of Osteopathic Medicine (LUCOM) is a private graduate medical school located in Lynchburg, Virginia. It is one of the 17 colleges and schools located in Liberty University. LUCOM was the second osteopathic medical school to open in the U.S. state of Virginia after the Edward Via College of Osteopathic Medicine. In 2018, the inaugural class of 126 medical students graduated.

History
In August 2014 Liberty University opened the college of osteopathic medicine. The college is housed in a 144,000-square-foot, $40 million building and was completed in 2014.

The college received provisional accreditation from the American Osteopathic Association through the American Osteopathic Association Commission on Osteopathic College Accreditation in 2013 and received full accreditation in 2018. The college secured long-term affiliations with Halifax Health, the Johnson Health Center, LifePoint, and a 30-year clinical clerkship and graduate medical education affiliation with Centra Health that includes a commitment of clinical rotations for 80 students per year.

In July 2015 the college of osteopathic medicine opened Liberty Mountain Medical Group LLC, a primary care clinic serving the greater Lynchburg area. Services include family medicine, internal medicine, pediatrics, and sports medicine, and will have a laboratory and X-ray imaging available.

Leadership 
2012-2016 Founding Dean Ronnie Martin, D.O.

2016-2017 Interim Dean David Klink, D.O. 

2017-2020 Dean Peter Alan Bell, D.O., MBA

2021-Present Dean Joseph Johnson, D.O.

See also
 List of medical schools in the United States

References

Medical schools in Virginia
Educational institutions established in 2014
School of Medicine
Osteopathic medical schools in the United States
2014 establishments in Virginia